Trent Thomas Klatt (born January 30, 1971) is an American former professional ice hockey right winger who played 14 seasons in the National Hockey League (NHL) for the Minnesota North Stars, Dallas Stars, Philadelphia Flyers, Vancouver Canucks and Los Angeles Kings.

Playing career
Klatt played his college hockey at the University of Minnesota. He was drafted in the fourth round of the 1989 NHL Entry Draft by the Washington Capitals.  He was traded on June 21, 1991 with Steve Maltais to the North Stars for Shawn Chambers.  Klatt played four and a half years with the Stars and was traded to the Flyers in December 1995.  It was in Philadelphia that Klatt enjoyed his finest offensive season in 1996–97 scoring 24 goals with 21 assists.  On October 19, 1998, Klatt was traded to the Canucks for a draft pick.  Klatt ended up playing five seasons with Vancouver, where he was perhaps best known for playing on a line with Daniel and Henrik Sedin in the twins' first three NHL seasons.  During the 2003 offseason, Klatt signed a free agent contract with the Kings.

During the NHL lockout of 2004–05, Klatt served on the NHLPA bargaining committee.  However, less than a month before the NHL was to restart for the 2005–06 season, Klatt announced his retirement from the NHL, citing family issues as the reason. Klatt coached Bantam A hockey in Grand Rapids, Minnesota along with fellow former NHL player Scot Kleinendorst..  Klatt is a former scout for the New York Islanders, where he has assumed responsibility for running the Islanders' draft table following the dismissal of former Islanders Asst. GM Ryan Jankowski.

Coaching career 
Klatt started as the Junior Varsity and Varsity coach for Grand Rapids high school in the 2015-2016 season where they finished 3rd in State.
He won his 1st Class AA Minnesota State High School Championship on Saturday March 11, 2017 with a 6-3 win over the Moorhead Spuds.

Career statistics

Regular season and playoffs

International

References

External links
 

1971 births
American men's ice hockey right wingers
Dallas Stars players
Ice hockey coaches from Minnesota
Kalamazoo Wings (1974–2000) players
Living people
Los Angeles Kings players
Minnesota Golden Gophers men's ice hockey players
Minnesota North Stars players
New York Islanders coaches
New York Islanders scouts
People from Robbinsdale, Minnesota
Philadelphia Flyers players
Syracuse Crunch players
Vancouver Canucks players
Washington Capitals draft picks
Ice hockey players from Minnesota